Less Is More is the debut studio album by Belgian DJ and record producer Lost Frequencies. It was released on 21 October 2016, by Lost & Cie under exclusive license to Armada Music and Ultra Music. The album was shortlisted by IMPALA (The Independent Music Companies Association) for the Album of the Year Award 2016, which rewards on a yearly basis the best album released on an independent European label.

Singles
"Are You with Me" was released as the first single on 26 January 2015. "Reality" (featuring Janieck Devy) was released as the second single on 24 May 2015. "Beautiful Life" (featuring Sandro Cavazza) was released as the third single on 3 June 2016. "What Is Love 2016" was released as the fourth single on 7 October 2016. "All or Nothing" (featuring Axel Ehnström) was released as the fifth single on 17 February 2017. "Here with You" was released as the sixth single on 30 June 2017.

Track listing

Charts

Weekly charts

Year-end charts

References

2016 albums
Lost Frequencies albums